Pōhiva Tu’i’onetoa (30 June 1951 – 18 March 2023) was a Tongan accountant and politician who served as the 17th Prime Minister of Tonga from 2019 to 2021. Tu'i'onetoa succeeded Semisi Sika, who had served as acting prime minister, since the death of ʻAkilisi Pōhiva.

Early life and education

Born in Talafo’ou on 30 June 1951, Tu’i’onetoa graduated from Institute of Chartered Accountants of New Zealand in 1982, and then the Monash University in 1993. He had a diploma in financial management and a master of business degree. He was also a certified management accountant.

Career

Tu’i’onetoa joined the Tonga Civil Service in January 1979. He was the Official Liquidator of the Commercial Division of the Department of Justice in Hamilton, New Zealand. Between 1983 and 2014 he served as Tonga's Auditor. He was a Private Secretary to King Tāufaʻāhau Tupou IV from 1987–1988, and also clerk to the Privy Council during the same period. He ran unsuccessfully for parliament in the 2010 Tongan general election.

In the 2014 general election, he was elected to the Legislative Assembly of Tonga to represent the constituency of Tongatapu 10. In the government of ʻAkilisi Pōhiva, he was Minister of Labor, Commerce and Industries, and Minister of Police, Prisons and Fire Services. In March 2017 he was appointed Minister of Revenue and Customs, replacing Tevita Lavemaau. He held that position until January 2018, when he was appointed Minister of Finance and National Planning.

Prime Minister of Tonga (2019–2021)

On 27 September 2019, Tu’i’onetoa was elected prime minister by fifteen votes against eight for Semisi Sika, who served as acting prime minister. It was officially announced by King Tupou VI on 9 October 2019. He announced his Cabinet appointments on 10 October.

On 12 January 2021, Tu'i'onetoa survived a confidence vote in Parliament, by 13 votes to 9.

Tuʻiʻonetoa was re-elected to parliament in the 2021 election, and announced his candidacy for re-election as Prime Minister, but later withdrew as a contender to back ʻAisake Eke. He was succeeded as Prime Minister by Siaosi Sovaleni.

On 29 April 2022, Tonga's Supreme Court declared his election void after finding he had bribed a women's group by offering them 50,000 Pa'anga. The conviction was stayed pending appeal on 26 May 2022. On 9 June 2022 he was again found to have committed bribery in a second election petition. On 9 August 2022 the Court of Appeal overturned both petitions.

Personal life and death

Tuʻiʻonetoa died in March 2023, at the age of 71.

Honours

National honours;

  Order of Queen Sālote Tupou III, Commander (31 July 2008).

References 

|-

|-

|-

|-

|-

|-

|-

|-

|-

1951 births
2023 deaths
Prime Ministers of Tonga
Finance Ministers of Tonga
Interior ministers of Tonga
Labour ministers of Tonga
Trade ministers of Tonga
Tourism ministers of Tonga
Members of the Legislative Assembly of Tonga
Democratic Party of the Friendly Islands politicians
Monash University alumni
People from Tongatapu
Commanders of the Order of Queen Sālote Tupou III
Foreign ministers of Tonga